Tim Allan (born May 29, 1955) is a former Canadian football offensive tackle who played for the Winnipeg Blue Bombers and Toronto Argonauts of the Canadian Football League. In 1978, he played in six regular season games between the two teams. While with the Argonauts, he recovered a fumble for a touchdown.

Injuries forced his early retirement, which led to him becoming a teacher.

References 

1955 births
Living people
Canadian football offensive linemen
Toronto Varsity Blues football players
Winnipeg Blue Bombers players
Toronto Argonauts players